Asperdaphne legrandi is a species of sea snail, a marine gastropod mollusk in the family Raphitomidae.

Description
The length of the shell attains 7 mm, its diameter 3.5 mm.

(Original description) The broad shell is turreted. The raised ribs are rounded. The striate interstices show fine lines which pass over the ribs. The shell contains five swollen whorls. The sinus is deep. The outer lip is varicose. The aperture is oval.

Distribution
This marine species is endemic to Australia and occurs off South Australia, Tasmania and Victoria.

References

 Pritchard, G.B. & Gatliff, J.H. 1900. Catalogue of the marine shells of Victoria. Part III. Proceedings of the Royal Society of Victoria 12(2): 170-205 
 Hedley, C. 1900. Studies on Australian Mollusca. Part II. Proceedings of the Linnean Society of New South Wales 25: 495-513 
 Gatliff, J.H. & Gabriel, C.J. 1908. Additions to and revision of the Catalogue of Victorian marine Mollusca. Proceedings of the Royal Society of Victoria n.s. 21(1): 368–391
 Verco, J.C. 1909. Notes on South Australian marine Mollusca with descriptions of new species. Part XII. Transactions of the Royal Society of South Australia 33: 293-342 
 Hedley, C. 1922. A revision of the Australian Turridae. Records of the Australian Museum 13(6): 213-359, pls 42-56 
 May, W.L. 1923. An Illustrated Index of Tasmanian Shells: with 47 plates and 1052 species. Hobart : Government Printer 100 pp.

External links
 
 

legrandi
Gastropods described in 1883
Gastropods of Australia